The 2019 OFC Champions League group stage was played from 10 February to 2 March 2019. A total of 16 teams competed in the group stage to decide the eight places in the knockout stage of the 2019 OFC Champions League.

Draw
The draw for the group stage was held on 13 November 2018 at the OFC Headquarters in Auckland, New Zealand. The 16 teams (14 teams entering the group stage and two teams advancing from the qualifying stage) were drawn into four groups of four, with the following mechanism:
The champions of the four host associations (Fiji, New Caledonia, Solomon Islands, Vanuatu) were drawn into Position 1 of Groups A–D.
The champions of the three remaining developed associations, and the runners-up of New Zealand, by virtue of having the best second team in the 2018 OFC Champions League, were drawn into Position 2 of Groups A–D.
The runners-up of the six developed associations apart from New Zealand were drawn into Position 3 of Groups A–D and Position 4 of Groups A–B (first team drawn to Groups A–B allocated to Position 3, second team drawn to Groups A–B allocated to Position 4). Teams from the same association could not be drawn into the same group.
The winners and runners-up of the qualifying stage, whose identity was not known at the time of the draw, were drawn into Position 4 of Groups C–D.
The following were the winners and runners-up of the qualifying stage which joined the 14 direct entrants in the group stage.

Format
The four teams in each group played each other on a round-robin basis at a centralised venue. The winners and runners-up of each group advanced to the quarter-finals of the knockout stage.

Schedule
Matches were played on the following dates and venues:
Group A matches were played between 10–16 February 2019 in New Caledonia.
Group B matches were played between 10–16 February 2019 in Fiji.
Group C matches were played between 23 February – 1 March 2019 in Vanuatu.
Group D matches were played between 24 February – 2 March 2019 in the Solomon Islands.
The schedule of each matchday was as follows.

Groups

Group A
All times were local, NCT (UTC+11).

Group B
All times were local, FJT (UTC+12).

Group C
All times were local, VUT (UTC+11).

Group D
All times were local, SBT (UTC+11).

Notes

References

External links
OFC Champions League 2019, oceaniafootball.com

2
February 2019 sports events in Oceania
March 2019 sports events in Oceania
International association football competitions hosted by New Caledonia
International association football competitions hosted by Fiji
International association football competitions hosted by Vanuatu
International association football competitions hosted by the Solomon Islands